Gustaf Oliver Forslund (April 25, 1908 – August 4, 1962) was a Swedish-born Canadian professional ice hockey right wing player. In the 1932–33 season, he became the first Swedish-born player in the National Hockey League, and played 48 games for the Ottawa Senators. The rest of his career, which lasted from 1926 to 1941, was spent in various minor leagues.

Early life
Gustaf Forslund was born in Holmsund in Västerbotten, Sweden to Lars Anton Forslund and his wife Ida Maria Fällman. When he was still a child, his family moved to Fort William and later Port Arthur, Ontario.

Playing career
First playing professional hockey for the Port Arthur Ports at age 20, he transferred to the Fort William Forts one year later. In 1929 he moved to Minnesota to play for the Duluth Hornets of the American Hockey Association (1926–1942). Playing 48 games for the Ottawa Senators in 1932–33, Forslund became the first Swede to play in the NHL. He scored a total of 13 points, 4 goals and 9 assists.

He went on to play for the Windsor Bulldogs of the International Hockey League (1929–1936) and the Philadelphia Arrows and New Haven Eagles in the Can-Am Hockey League. He ended his career playing in the Thunder Bay Senior League until 1941. In 1939–40, Forslund led the Thunder Bay Senior League with 39 points in 24 games.

After hockey
After retiring, Forslund helped organise youth hockey. After his wife died at 39, he was left to raise their two children alone. He died from a stroke in 1962 when he was 54.

Career statistics

Regular season and playoffs

External links
 
 Obituary at LostHockey.com
 

1908 births
1962 deaths
Canadian ice hockey right wingers
Duluth Hornets players
Ice hockey people from Ontario
New Haven Eagles players
Ottawa Senators (1917) players
People from Umeå Municipality
Philadelphia Arrows players
Sportspeople from Thunder Bay
Swedish emigrants to Canada
Swedish ice hockey players
Sportspeople from Västerbotten County
Windsor Bulldogs (1929–1936) players